Everybody's Gone to the Rapture is an adventure video game developed by The Chinese Room and published by Sony Computer Entertainment for the PlayStation 4. It is a story-based game, taking place in a small English village whose inhabitants have mysteriously disappeared. It is considered a spiritual successor to Dear Esther, also by The Chinese Room. It was released for the PlayStation 4 on 11 August 2015. It was released for Windows on 14 April 2016.

Gameplay
In Everybody's Gone to the Rapture, the player explores a small English village whose inhabitants have mysteriously disappeared. The player can interact with floating lights throughout the world, most of which can reveal parts of the story. The player can interact with objects such as doors, radios, phones, fences, and power switches.

Plot
The game takes place in 1984 in a fictional Shropshire village named Yaughton. The player's objective is to explore and try to discover how and why everyone in the village has disappeared. Mysterious floating orbs of light swim around the air and lead the player to scenes made up of other human-shaped lights, which re-enact various previously occurring events. Following the orbs' evidence from scene-to-scene across the valley, as well as finding telephones and radios that replay conversations, recordings, and broadcasts, eventually provide all of the puzzle pieces to the game's main event, the "rapture".

There are five areas in the game, each of which revolve around a different character, with the main protagonists being Dr Katherine "Kate" Collins and her husband, Stephen Appleton, both scientists at the observatory. During their work, Kate and Stephen encounter a strange pattern of lights in the night sky which they believe is an unknown form of life. They observe the pattern infecting and sometimes killing other lifeforms such as birds and cows, before spreading to humans. Kate concludes that the pattern is attempting to communicate with humans, ignorant to the harm that it is causing them. She locks herself in the observatory and spends the vast majority of the story attempting to communicate with it. During this time, Stephen becomes convinced that the pattern is a deadly threat capable of destroying the human race.

Most of the valley's inhabitants begin to succumb to symptoms of unexplained hemorrhaging; pressure in the brain that is normally consistent with a brain tumor, as the doctor notes in a left-behind recording. Other people disappear, leaving behind a room full of odd specks of light and the lingering scent of unidentifiable ash. Convinced that this is connected to the pattern and that it will spread beyond the village if not contained, Stephen urges the local government to quarantine the area, blocking the roads and cutting the telephone lines. The locals are told that it is due to an outbreak of Spanish flu, though many are skeptical of this and become even more so when the corpses of the dead begin to disappear into thin air.

As the town's population rapidly dwindles, Stephen realizes that the quarantine has failed and that the 'pattern', or 'It' as it is often referred to, has learned to adapt. He believes that it has learned to travel not just through direct human contact, but through the telephone lines, radio waves, and television sets. In light of this, he desperately insists to the local government that they must gas the valley.

In the penultimate chapter of the game, the player is led to a bunker where Stephen waited out the nerve gas bombings with the intention of killing himself once he ensured that every other infected person in the valley is dead. When he is unable to reach anyone at all outside the valley via telephone, he realizes that he has failed and that the pattern has spread, presumably to the entire planet. The pattern comes for him and he confronts It. He tells It that he has decided to set fire to himself, having doused himself in petrol to prevent being taken by It. Moments before he igniting the fuel, an image of Kate appears in the pattern of the light. Stephen stands in awe, reaching out to her. The scene fades out as Stephen's lighter slips out of his hand and hits the ground, igniting the petrol.

In the final part of the game the player is transported to the inside of the observatory's locked entrance gate. The player makes their way up the hill to the top-most observatory and upon entering, sees the human light shape of Kate inside in the darkness, making the last of the recordings heard. She states that she is the last one left, and it is revealed that she did achieve communication with It. Kate explains that when she told the pattern that what it did to everyone in the valley - the people, the birds, the insects, the cows - was wrong; It countered that it was not wrong, because now everyone that wanted to be together was together, and that everyone had found their counterpart and was no longer alone. Kate explains how she finally understands and says that she has accepted her fate, and that she and 'the pattern' will soon join the others. She states that humanity can finally 'slip away, unafraid.' Kate turns and appears to reach out to the pattern coming down from above as it reaches out to meet her, her last words being her belief that the pattern was her own counterpart.

Development
During the development of Dear Esther, the team wanted to introduce interactive elements. When this proved to be impractical, the concept of Everybody's Gone to the Rapture was born. The developers were inspired by "the very British apocalyptic sci-fi of the 60s and 70", like John Christopher's The Death of Grass and Charles Eric Maine's The Tide Went Out.
The team made the decision to partner with Sony as they felt they could not raise enough money for the project through crowdfunding sources or through sales of alpha versions. A Windows version of the game was released on 14 April 2016. The game's soundtrack composed by Jessica Curry was published by Sony Classical as a 28-track album in the UK.

Reception

Everybody's Gone to the Rapture received positive reviews, receiving an aggregated score of 78/100 on Metacritic based on 81 reviews.

GamesRadar called the game "brave, [...] challenging, and [...] essential", while IGN talked about "a beautiful, heart-breaking journey into the end of the world". Everybody's Gone to the Rapture was featured on several "Best games of the year" lists, such as Kirk Hamilton's from Kotaku, Alexa Ray Corriea's from GameSpot or Kill Screen's "Best Videogames of 2015" list.

Some reviewers criticized what was perceived as too little interactivity from the player. Jim Sterling, while analysing games often derided as "walking simulators", said that Everybody's Gone to the Rapture is a model of what not to do in this genre, such as by not shifting the tone of the game as it progresses, and by making the back-story more interesting than the game itself. They unfavorably compared it to Gone Home and The Stanley Parable. Ben "Yahtzee" Croshaw of The Escapist called it the 4th blandest game of 2015, saying that it deserves the title of "walking simulator", and for how little it did to evolve the interactive story genre, comparing it unfavorably to The Stanley Parable as well.

Accolades

References

External links
 

2015 video games
Adventure games
Apocalyptic video games
Art games
CryEngine games
Exploration video games
Open-world video games
PlayStation 4 games
Video games developed in the United Kingdom
Video games featuring female protagonists
Video games scored by Jessica Curry
Video games set in 1984
Video games set in the United Kingdom
Video games set in Shropshire
Windows games
BAFTA winners (video games)